Déniz or Deniz (also written Denis in some parts of South America, see Denis) is a Spanish-Portuguese surname derived from the French surname De Niz. Deniz, although of different origin, is also Turkish name.

People with Déniz surnames of Spanish-Portuguese origin can be found mostly in the Canary Islands, Azores, Madeira and in the Americas (USA, Cuba, etc.).

De Niz in French, Spanish and Portuguese means "from Niz", where Niz is a defunct spelling variation of the name of the French city Nice. De Nice was written Déniz in Spanish and Portuguese. People bearing that surname in Spain and Portugal and their descendants have the surname with French roots. Alternatively, the Portuguese surname deNiz means "from the be-giN'ing", intricately related with the End.

Deniz can refer to the following people: 

 Atiye Deniz (born 1988), Turkish singer
 Burak Deniz, Turkish actor
 Derviş Kemal Deniz (born 1954), Turkish-Cypriot politician
 Elif Deniz (born 1993), Turkish women's footballer
 Erhan Deniz (born 1985), Turkish kickboxer 
 Frank Deniz (1912–2005), British jazz guitarist
 Fuat Deniz (1967–2007), Turkish-Swedish sociologist and writer of Assyrian descent
 Leslie Deniz (born 1962), American discus thrower
 Okan Deniz (born 1994), Turkish footballer
 Semih Deniz (born 1989), Turkish Paralympian middle distance runner

See also
Deniz (given name)
Denis of Portugal

References 

Surnames
Turkish-language surnames

de:Deniz